The men's 50 kilometres walk  at the 2019 World Athletics Championships was held in Doha, Qatar, on 28–29 September 2019.

Summary
This race marked the eleventh world championships for João Vieira, tying his contemporary teammate Susana Feitor for the second most.  Feitor was only 16 at her first appearance, Vieira was 23 at his.

Based on the previous evening's marathon, the desert heat was going to affect the outcome.  This race too started at midnight in order to avoid the heat of the day in Doha, that would mean temperatures hovered around 32 °C 90 °F throughout the race.  Most walkers were wary of starting too fast, only 20K world record holder Yusuke Suzuki went out fast, opening up a gap just a few minutes into the race.  By 5K he had a 10 second lead over a chase pack of only four others, including the world record holder and defending champion Yohann Diniz and Olympic champion Matej Tóth, the rest of the field was 37 seconds or more back.  As they were approaching 10K, Diniz decided the man who had taken his 20K world record was too serious a challenger to his title and bridged the ever growing gap.  That extra effort didn't last too long before Diniz was sliding back through the field.  Diniz eventually dropped out.  By 15K, Suzuki had 45 seconds over Tóth and Isaac Palma, the rest of the peloton almost 1:20 back.  At 20K, he had over 2 minutes as Tóth and Palma dropped back.  Neither would finish.  At the half way point, Suzuki had over 3 minutes against new leaders of the chase pack.

Luo Yadong and Niu Wenbin teamed up to try to bridge the gap, Luo getting barely under 3 minutes back by 30K, but by 35K Suzuki had opened up 3:34.  As Luo dropped back through the field, the next racer behind Niu was Vieira, still over 4:30 back with 10K to go.  Suzuki first showed signs of cracking, stopping at the water station at 44K before getting back on stride.  At that point he still had two minutes on Niu, an additional minute on Vieira with the next chaser Evan Dunfee another minute back, now ahead of Luo.  Niu had his second red card and was on the edge of disqualification.  He couldn't push.  One 2K lap later, Suzuki stopped again at the water station and again one lap later.  Still with a huge lead, Suzuki struggled through the final lap while Vieira and Dunfee were applying the pressure.  Both passed Niu, with Dunfee closing down his gap to Vieira.  Suzuki got across the finish line first, only 39 seconds ahead of Vieira, who held off Dunfee by only 3 seconds.

At age 43, Vieira became the oldest medalist.  Suzuki's winning time of 4:04:20 was the slowest winning time in the event's history dating back to 1976 by almost 10 minutes.  Of 46 starters, 14 dropped out and an additional four were disqualified.  35 minutes after the last competitor crossed the line, it was sunrise in Doha.

Records
Before the competition records were as follows:

Schedule
The event schedule, in local time (UTC+3), was as follows:

Results
The final was started at 23:30.

References

50 kilometres walk
Racewalking at the World Athletics Championships